James Richburg is an American poker player from Long Beach, California.

Richburg has won two World Series of Poker bracelets.  The first came in the razz event in 2006.  He won his second in the $2,500 HORSE event in 2007.

As of 2017, Richburg's total live tournament cashes exceed $525,000.

World Series of Poker Bracelets

Notes

Year of birth missing (living people)
Living people
American poker players
World Series of Poker bracelet winners
People from Long Beach, California